Timothy Lenard Pickett (born April 18, 1981) is an American professional basketball player. He played collegiately at Florida State University, and was drafted in the 2nd round of the 2004 NBA draft by the New Orleans Hornets.

Career
In February 2006 he signed for Coopsette Rimini in the Italian second league, LegADue.
After five games he was suspended for doping (cannabis), but in September 2006 returned to Rimini after the disqualification.

For the 2007/08 season, he was signed with LegADue team Andrea Costa Imola.

Following that Pickett has also played for PBC Lukoil Academic from Bulgaria, Shaanxi Gaitianli Kylins from China and Capitanes de Arecibo from Puerto Rico.

On September 14, 2010, Pickett signed with Ironi Ashkelon from Israel.

In July 2011, he was signed by the Meralco Bolts. However, he was only able to play a couple of games because of an injury at the 2nd quarter of their game against Talk 'N Text.

On January 6, 2012, Picket signed with the Xinjiang Guanghui Flying Tigers of the Chinese Basketball Association, replacing Patrick Mills on the roster. He scored 35 points in his first game with Xinjiang.

He has signed with the Hacettepe Üniversitesi B.K. of the Turkish Basketball Association for 2013–2014 season. He scored 11 points(3/9 FG, 1/5 3PT, 2/2 FT) in his first game with Hacettepe. However, he was released by Hacettepe after the first game.

Personal life
Pickett was arrested in June, 2014 for soliciting a prostitute in Daytona Beach, Florida.

References

External links
Player profile

1981 births
Living people
African-American basketball players
American expatriate basketball people in Bulgaria
American expatriate basketball people in China
American expatriate basketball people in France
American expatriate basketball people in Israel
American expatriate basketball people in Italy
American expatriate basketball people in Jordan
American expatriate basketball people in Mexico
American expatriate basketball people in the Philippines
American expatriate basketball people in Turkey
American expatriate basketball people in Venezuela
American men's basketball players
Andrea Costa Imola players
ASVEL Basket players
Basketball players from Florida
Basket Rimini Crabs players
Bucaneros de La Guaira players
Caballeros de Culiacán players
Capitanes de Arecibo players
Daytona State Falcons men's basketball players
Florida Flame players
Florida State Seminoles men's basketball players
Frayles de Guasave players
Gigantes del Estado de México players
Guaiqueríes de Margarita players
Guangzhou Loong Lions players
Hacettepe Üniversitesi B.K. players
Indian River State Pioneers men's basketball players
Ironi Ashkelon players
La Unión basketball players
Mainland High School alumni
Meralco Bolts players
New Orleans Hornets draft picks
PBC Academic players
Philippine Basketball Association imports
Small forwards
Sportspeople from Daytona Beach, Florida
Shanxi Loongs players
Xinjiang Flying Tigers players
21st-century African-American sportspeople
20th-century African-American people